Mesoveliidae is a family of water treaders in the order Hemiptera. There are about 16 genera and at least 50 described species in Mesoveliidae.

Genera
These 12 extant genera belong to the family Mesoveliidae:

 Austrovelia Malipatil and Monteith, 1983
 Cavaticovelia Andersen and J. Polhemus, 1980
 Cryptovelia Andersen and J. Polhemus, 1980
 Darwinivelia Andersen and J. Polhemus, 1980
 Madeovelia Poisson, 1959
 Mesovelia Mulsant & Rey, 1852
 Mesoveloidea Hungerford, 1929
 Mniovelia Andersen and J. Polhemus, 1980
 Nereivelia J. Polhemus and D. Polhemus, 1989
 Phrynovelia Horváth, 1915
 Seychellovelia Andersen and D. Polhemus, 2003
 Speovelia Esaki, 1929

Fossil genera 

 †Duncanovelia Jell & Duncan, 1986
 †Gallomesovelia Nel et al. 2014 France, Late Jurassic (Kimmeridgian)
 †Malenavelia Solórzano Kraemer and Perrichot 2014 Charantese amber, France, Late Cretaceous (Cenomanian)
 †Emilianovelia Solórzano Kraemer and Perrichot 2014 Charantese amber, France, Late Cretaceous (Cenomanian)
 †Glaesivelia Sánchez-García & Solórzano Kraemer, 2017 Spanish amber, Early Cretaceous (Albian)
 †Iberovelia Sánchez-García & Nel, 2017 Spanish amber, Early Cretaceous (Albian)
 †Sinovelia Yao, Zhang and Ren, 2012, Early Cretaceous (Yixian)

References

Further reading

External links

 

Mesovelioidea
Heteroptera families
Articles created by Qbugbot